Ignacio Hierro González (born 22 June 1978) is a Mexican former football defender who is now retired. Among other clubs, he played for Atlante F.C., in the México Primera División. He currently holds an executive position at Club Atlante and is one of the founders and former Chief Editor of "Yo Soy Futbol" a magazine aimed exclusively to Mexican professional football players, coaches and directors.

Career
Hierro debuted for América on February 8, 1997, as the Aguilas defeated Puebla F.C., 2–0. He was involved in a controversial transfer in 1999, when he was traded to arch-rival club Chivas de Guadalajara, becoming another player to dispute the Mexican SuperClasico for both sides. After Chivas, he joined Atlante in 2000. He bounced around many teams in the Mexican League, most notably CF Monterrey, where he was champion in 2003.

Ignacio had become a fixture in Atlante, where he won in Apertura 2007 the Mexican Liguilla. Most recently, he played in 11 games for Atlante's filial team Potros Chetumal during the Apertura 2008, as their vice-captain.

He retired early in his career, due to frequent injuries and five surgeries in five years.

International career
Ignacio Hierro was on the Mexican U-20 team for the 1997 FIFA World Youth Championship held in Malaysia. He was capped 12 times for the senior team, disputing the 2000 CONCACAF Gold Cup and 2002 CONCACAF Gold Cup, and the Copa América 2001.

Honours
Mexico U23
Pan American Games Gold Medal: Winnipeg 99

Monterrey
Mexican Championship: Clausura 2003

Atlante
Mexican Championship: Apertura 2007

References 

 De Futbolista a Futbolista
 Vuelve a las canchas

External links
 
 

1978 births
Living people
Liga MX players
C.D. Guadalajara managers
Atlante F.C. footballers
Club Puebla players
C.F. Monterrey players
C.F. Pachuca players
Club América footballers
Club León footballers
Association football defenders
Mexico under-20 international footballers
Mexico international footballers
2000 CONCACAF Gold Cup players
2001 Copa América players
2002 CONCACAF Gold Cup players
Footballers from Mexico City
Mexican footballers
Mexican football managers